The Men's 4 × 100 metre medley relay competition at the 2017 World Championships was held on 30 July 2017.

Records
Prior to the competition, the existing world and championship records were as follows.

Results

Heats
The heats were held at 10:27.

Final
The final was held at 19:25.

References

Men's 4 x 100 metre medley relay